The First Men in the Moon is a 1919 black-and-white silent film, directed by Bruce Gordon and J. L. V. Leigh. The film was based on H. G. Wells' 1901 science fiction novel The First Men in the Moon.

As of August 2010, the film is not held in the BFI National Archive and is listed on the British Film Institute's "75 Most Wanted" list of lost films.  Stills from the production and a plot synopsis exist.

Plot
The synopsis from The Bioscope trade paper of 5 June 1919 reads as follows:
In the company of Rupert Bedford, a grasping speculator, Samson Cavor, an elderly inventor-scientist, ascends to the Moon in a sphere coated with 'Cavorite', a substance which has the property of neutralizing the law of gravity.  After strange adventures with the 'Selenites' (the inhabitants of the Moon), Bedford villainously deserts the professor and returns to Earth alone in order to make a fortune for himself out of Cavorite. By means of wireless telegraphy, however, Hogben, a young engineer in love with Cavor's niece, Susan, succeeds in getting in touch with the stranded inventor, who denounces Bedford and states that he has been amicably received by the Grand Lunar, overlord of the Selenites.  Susan thereupon indignantly rejects the proposals of Bedford, who has represented it as Cavor's last wish that she should marry him, and, instead, accepts Hogben as her husband.

Notability
Robert Godwin credits the film as "the first movie to ever be based entirely on a famous science fiction novel." Frankenstein, a loose adaptation of Mary Shelley's 1818 eponymous novel, however, had appeared in 1910, with a running time of 14 minutes, and Universal Pictures released a full length feature film of Jules Verne's 20,000 Leagues Under the Sea in 1916.

Cast
 Bruce Gordon as Hogben 
 Heather Thatcher as Susan
 Hector Abbas as Sampson Cavor
 Lionel d'Aragon as Rupert Bedford
 Cecil Morton York as Grand Lunar

See also
List of lost films

References

External links
BFI 75 Most Wanted entry, with extensive notes (published 23 December 2010, retrieved the from Internet Archive on 23 June 2020)

1919 films
1910s science fiction films
British silent feature films
British science fiction films
British black-and-white films
Films about extraterrestrial life
Films based on works by H. G. Wells
Lost British films
Moon in film
1919 lost films
1910s British films
Silent horror films
Silent science fiction films
1910s English-language films